3-Methylhexane is a branched hydrocarbon with two enantiomers.  It is one of the isomers of heptane.

The molecule is chiral, and is one of the two isomers of heptane to have this property, the other being its structural isomer 2,3-dimethylpentane.  The enantiomers are (R)-3-methylhexane and (S)-3-methylhexane.

References

Alkanes